The Wold Cottage meteorite (also called the Wold Newton meteorite) fell near Wold Cottage farm in 1795, a few miles away from the village of Wold Newton in Yorkshire, England.

The meteorite
The stone fell at around 3 o'clock, on 13 December 1795, landing within a few yards of ploughman John Shipley. The fall was observed by several people, who described a dark body passing through the air. As discovered at its landing point, the stone was warm and smoking; several people reported sounds of explosions as it fell. The owner of the land was Major Edward Topham, a well-known public figure, an ex-soldier, playwright and newspaper proprietor; he publicised the find and exhibited the meteorite publicly at Piccadilly in London.

James Sowerby, a naturalist, acquired the meteorite in 1804. The meteorite was later acquired by the British Museum in 1835.

The meteorite can nowadays be seen in the Natural History Museum in London.

Analysis and research
Early analyses recorded two parts of the stone, an earthy part, and a malleable part. The earthy part analysed as containing silicon, magnesium, iron, and a small amount of nickel, of which some parts of the iron and nickel were in the elemental state; the earthy substance was similar to kaolin (weathered feldspar), but relatively tough. The malleable parts also contained iron and nickel, the majority iron. A form of iron pyrites (iron sulphur compound) was also reported present. Modern science records the meteorite as a L6 ordinary chondrite.

The Wold Cottage meteorite was the largest meteorite observed to fall in Britain, and is the second-largest recorded in Europe (after the Ensisheim meteorite). The meteorite and evidence given about its fall contributed to the debate concerning whether extraterrestrial matter existed or not, and towards the early scientific study of meteorites.

The monument

A monument was erected on the location of the stone's impact, by Major Topham, on whose property the stone had fallen.

In fiction
The event was used by the science fiction writer Philip José Farmer in his "biographies" of fictional characters (Tarzan Alive and Doc Savage: His Apocalyptic Life) as the basis for a literary premise commonly referred to as the Wold Newton family. The film Robinson in Ruins would also refer to the event, with the main character, Robinson, seeing it showing meteorites always fall at the time of significant events, in this case the 1795 amendment to the Settlement Act which allowed capitalism to develop faster in England.

The meteorite plays quite a central role in the 2019 detective novel Sherlock Holmes & The Christmas Demon by British author James Lovegrove.

See also
 Glossary of meteoritics

Notes

Literature

External links

, Images related to the Wold Cottage Meteorite and monument

Meteorites found in the United Kingdom
Wold Newton, East Riding of Yorkshire
1795 in England
1795 in science
History of the East Riding of Yorkshire
Thwing and Octon